Afghan passports are identity and travel documents issued by the Ministry of Interior to citizens of Afghanistan in order for them to visit other countries around the world. Every citizen with a valid Afghan identity card (Tazkira) can apply for and receive an Afghan passport, which is renewable every 5-10 years. The Afghan passport was introduced by Emir Abdur Rahman Khan in 1880. It recently became a biometric passport. Alam Gul Haqqani is the current head of the passport department.

The Afghan passport has been labelled by the Henley Passport Index as the least powerful passport in the world, with its nationals only able to visit 26 destinations visa-free. The cost of a new 5-year Afghan passport is 5,000 afghanis (AFS). A 10-year passport requires 10,000 AFS. Up to 10,000 Afghan passports can be issued in a day.

History
The Afghan passport was introduced by Emir Abdur Rahman Khan in 1880.

In September 2011, Afghanistan's Ministry of Foreign Affairs began issuing two types of biometric passports (e-passports) for Afghan diplomats and public servants. These were produced in the United Kingdom. The standard e-passports began being issued to the general public in March 2013. According to then-spokesman of the Ministry of Foreign Affairs, Janan Musazai, "on the photo page, there are 16 security codes." Issuance of national computerized e-ID cards (e-Tazkiras) were also discussed. These changes were intended to prevent fraud in future elections and government corruption as well as to improve the overall security of Afghanistan. 

In 2017, a new five-year Afghan e-passport was reported to cost 5,000 AFS. Previously, passports had been hand written based on information found on paper Afghan ID cards, which are no longer accepted. A ten-year passport later became available for 10,000 AFS. By January 2016, nearly one million of the new computerized Afghan passports have been issued.

Afghanistan has a number of passport distribution offices, with the main one located in Kabul. The General Directorate of Passports announced in August 2022 that a total of four different locations within Kabul will soon begin distributing passports.

Ordinary passports (those other than diplomatic or service passports) can be issued by Afghan embassies and consulates abroad. After a pause following the Taliban takeover of the government in August 2021, issuing of passports resumed before the end of that year. Though it was reported in March 2022 that the Taliban had introduced a new design bearing the name "Islamic Emirate of Afghanistan", Shirshah Quarishi, deputy director of the Passport Department, said in August 2022 that newly issued passports would not carry a new design, which was likely a practical decision taken to ensure they would be accepted for travel by other countries, all of which continue to recognize the previous regime.

Visa requirements

 Afghan citizens have visa-free or visa on arrival access to 26 countries and territories, ranking the passport 116th and worst in the world according to the Henley Passport Index. Because the ruling Islamic Emirate of Afghanistan is not internationally recognized, it is continuing to issue passports bearing the name of the former, internationally-recognized government, the Islamic Republic of Afghanistan, which are accepted for international travel. However, obtaining foreign visas from within Afghanistan is difficult as many embassies in Afghanistan have closed in the wake of the Fall of Kabul on 15 August 2021.

Corruption
In 2015, Afghanistan's TOLOnews reported that a number of citizens of Iran and Pakistan have fraudulently obtained Afghan passports. It was reported recently "that a number of counterfeiters abroad had prepared passport booklets, smuggled them into the country and distributed them to the public."

See also
 Afghan identity card
 Afghan nationality law
 Visa requirements for Afghan citizens

References

External links
The biodata page of an Afghan passport
 (RTA Pashto, March 1, 2023)
 (Ariana News, March 1, 2023)

Afghanistan
Government of Afghanistan